Crookston is a small rural settlement in West Otago, in the South Island of New Zealand. It is located on SH 90 between Tapanui and Edievale, and lies 6 km east of Heriot.

The name of Crookston is likely in honour of an early surveyor. The settlement was previously known as Crookston Flat and McKellars Flat.

References

Populated places in Otago
Clutha District